The Mobile and Ohio Railroad was a railroad in the Southern U.S. The M&O was chartered in January and February 1848 by the states of Alabama, Kentucky, Mississippi, and Tennessee.  It was planned to span the distance between the seaport of Mobile, Alabama and the Ohio River near Cairo, Illinois.  On September 13, 1940 it was merged with the Gulf, Mobile and Northern Railroad to form the Gulf, Mobile and Ohio Railroad.

History
The Mobile and Ohio Railroad was conceived after hard times in Mobile following the Panic of 1837. The port was not generating the business that it had before the panic and businessmen and citizens in the city were inspired with a plan for a railroad to restore commerce to the city.  The first section of track opened for service in 1852 between Mobile and  Citronelle, Alabama and was constructed in  gauge. The line made it to Columbus, Kentucky on April 22, 1861, steamboats were then used to connect with the Illinois Central Railroad at Cairo.

The start of the Civil War shortly after the completion of the line saw it converted to military use and it quickly became a military target for both sides during the war.  Following the conflict the M&O had to be almost entirely rebuilt and was facing near total financial ruin due in part to an unpaid debt of $5,228,562 that had been owed by the Confederate government.  It was placed in receivership in 1875 and did not emerge until eight years later.

By 1870 the operators had seen the need to complete the line all the way to Cairo and make it the northern terminus instead of Columbus, but financial problems stood in the way. Finally on May 1, 1882 the extension to Cairo was opened. The company then acquired the St. Louis and Cairo Railroad, which was narrow gauge.

In 1896 the company decided to build a line from its Columbus, Mississippi, terminal toward Florida.  On June 30, 1898 the Tuscaloosa to Montgomery line opened in Alabama, along with two short branch lines.  That same year they decided to build a  line from Mobile to Alabama Port and Bayou La Batre, naming it the Mobile and Bay Shore Railway.  It was completed in 1899.

The M&O's stockholders and bondholders accepted a stock exchange plan in 1901 from Southern Railway.  A merger of the two was attempted in 1902 but vetoed by Mississippi governor James K. Vardaman.  Thereafter the M&O continued operations under Southern's control. From 1908 the M&O was considered to be a highly prosperous railroad, but net income declined sharply after 1926 and by 1930 the M&O had a net deficit of almost $1,000,000.  On June 3, 1932, the M&O went into receivership again.  Southern was accused of having violated the Clayton Antitrust Act by using the M&O for its own profit at the expense of the M&O, though the case was dropped in 1933.  Southern sold its M&O bonds in 1940 to the Gulf, Mobile and Northern Railroad.  The GM&N was then combined with the M&O to form the Gulf, Mobile and Ohio Railroad.

See also

List of defunct Alabama railroads
List of defunct Illinois railroads
List of defunct Kentucky railroads
List of defunct Mississippi railroads
List of defunct Missouri railroads
List of defunct Tennessee railroads

References

External links

Predecessors of the Gulf, Mobile and Ohio Railroad
Former Class I railroads in the United States
Rail lines receiving land grants
Railway companies established in 1848
Railway companies disestablished in 1940
Defunct Alabama railroads
Defunct Missouri railroads
Defunct Illinois railroads
Defunct Kentucky railroads
Defunct Tennessee railroads
Defunct Mississippi railroads
5 ft gauge railways in the United States
American companies established in 1848